Points of Order (also known as Cyclops) is the fourteenth album by American composer Bill Laswell, released on October 1, 2001 by Innerhythmic. It was originally issued as a digital download through eMusic in the MP3 format.

Track listing

Personnel 
Adapted from the Points of Order liner notes.
Musicians
Antipop Consortium – rap
Karl Berger – piano
Buckethead – guitar
Graham Haynes – cornet
Karsh Kale – drums
Toshinori Kondo – trumpet
Bill Laswell – bass guitar, drum programming, effects, producer
Technical personnel
John Brown – cover art
Michael Fossenkemper – mastering
Robert Musso – engineering

Release history

References

External links 
 

2001 albums
Bill Laswell albums
Albums produced by Bill Laswell